Riethoven is a village in the Dutch province of North Brabant. The adjacent township of Walik is in general considered to be a part of Riethoven.
Riethoven was originally called Rijthoven, but with time it changed into Riethoven. In Dutch The name means: farms at the Rijt, the Rijt being a river near the municipality.

Riethoven was a separate municipality until 1997, when it became part of Bergeijk.

The spoken language is Kempenlands (an East Brabantian dialect, which is very similar to Standard Dutch).

Notable people
Martin Rythovius (1511), the first Bishop of Ypres
Henk van Gerven (1955), politician
Wilbert Das (1963), Fashion designer

Gallery

References

Municipalities of the Netherlands disestablished in 1997
Populated places in North Brabant
Former municipalities of North Brabant
Bergeijk